Jim Stone (born November 18, 1958) is a former American football running back in the USFL who played for the Chicago Blitz. He played college football for the Notre Dame Fighting Irish.

References

1958 births
Living people
American football running backs
Chicago Blitz players
Notre Dame Fighting Irish football players